Jamieson "Junior" Brown (born June 12, 1952) is an American country guitarist and singer. He has released twelve studio albums in his career, and has charted twice on the Billboard country singles charts. Brown's signature instrument is the "guit-steel" double neck guitar, a hybrid of electric guitar and lap steel guitar.

Life and career
Brown was born in Cottonwood, Arizona; at an early age his family moved to Kirksville, Indiana. He first learned to play piano from his father (Samuel Emmons Brown Jr.) "before I could talk". His music career began in the 1960s, and he worked through that decade and the next singing and playing pedal steel and guitar for groups such as The Last Mile Ramblers, Dusty Drapes and the Dusters, Billy Spears and Asleep at the Wheel while developing his guitar skills. In the early 1980s, he appeared on stage with Rank and File as the replacement for Alejandro Escovedo. However, he did not feature on any recordings by that band.

By the mid-1980s, Brown was teaching guitar at the Hank Thompson School of Country Music at Rogers State University, in Claremore, Oklahoma.

In 1985, Brown created a new type of double-neck guitar, with some assistance from Michael Stevens. Brown called the instrument his "guit-steel". When performing, Brown plays the guitar by standing behind it, while it rests on a small music stand. The top neck on the guit-steel is a traditional six-string guitar, while the lower neck is a full-size lap steel guitar for slide playing. Brown has two guit-steels for recording and live work. The original instrument, dubbed "Old Yeller", has as its standard six-string guitar portion the neck and pickups from Brown's previous stage guitar, a Fender Bullet. The second guit-steel, named "Big Red", has a neck laser-copied from the Bullet neck; but in addition to electric guitar pickups, both the standard and lap-steel necks use identical Sho-Bud lap-steel pickups. There is a pocket in the upper bout of the guitar to hold the slide bar when it is not in use. Brown also commissioned a "pedal guit-steel" which adds pedals to the instrument for more musical control. Brown has stated that the invention of the guit-steel was always a matter of convenience so that he could play both lap steel and lead guitar during live performances and not directly motivated by a desire to be a "one man band".

Brown quickly became a local success in Austin, Texas, as the house band at the Continental Club. His debut album was 12 Shades of Brown (1990), released by the British Demon Records; it was re-released in 1993 on Curb Records in the United States, followed by Guit with It. In 1996, Brown released Semi Crazy, and followed it with Long Walk Back (1997).

In 1996, Brown was featured on the Beach Boys' now out-of-print album Stars and Stripes Vol. 1 performing a cover of their 1962 hit "409". The song features Brown playing guitar and singing lead with the Beach Boys singing harmonies and backing vocals.

Brown appeared in the music video for "Honky Tonk Song" by George Jones in 1996 and also won the CMA Country Music Video of the Year award that year for his video, "My Wife Thinks You're Dead", which featured 6-foot-7-inch Gwendolyn Gillingham. Brown played a cameo part in "Drive", the second episode of season six of The X-Files. Brown's music has been showcased on various television series and movie soundtracks, including Me, Myself & Irene, SpongeBob SquarePants and the 2005 Dukes of Hazzard remake, in which he also played the narrator.

Although Brown plays such neotraditional country styles as honky-tonk, Western swing, etc., some of his performances will finish with some blues and Tex-Mex tunes playing as well as surf rock instrumentals.

Beginning in August 2006, Brown joined Webb Wilder's tour of American minor league baseball stadiums. He reprised his role in an episode ("World of Hurt, BC") of Adult Swim's Xavier: Renegade Angel created by rock band PFFR. In April 2008, Brown shot three pilot episodes of a country music program modeled after programs from the early 1960s, in which Brown will play with a house band as well as guests as host of the show. On October 12, 2012, Brown released the EP Volume 10, containing six new songs.

AMC previewed the video of his new song "Better Call Saul", on October 5, 2014. On May 24, 2018, Brown released his 11th album, Deep in the Heart Of Me.

On May 27, 2020, Rolling Stone magazine's listing of 50 Country Albums Every Rock Fan Should Own, honored Brown’s US released album, 12 Shades of Brown, (Curb Records, 1993).

In May 2020, Brown and his wife began hosting a series of live Facebook concerts under the name, "The Junior & Tanya Rae Brown Show".

Discography

Albums

Singles

Music videos

Awards and nominations

Awards
Country Music Association
 1996 Video of the Year - "My Wife Thinks You're Dead"

Nominations
Grammy Awards
 1995 Best Country Album - Junior High
 1996 Best Male Country Vocal Performance - "My Wife Thinks You're Dead"
 1996 Best Country Song – "My Wife Thinks You're Dead" written by Junior Brown

Academy of Country Music
 1995 Top Country Video - "My Wife Thinks You're Dead"

References

External links
 Official Junior Brown web site
 [ Allmusic]
 Junior Brown Interview NAMM Oral History Library (2002)

1952 births
Living people
People from Yavapai County, Arizona
American country guitarists
American male guitarists
American country singer-songwriters
American male singer-songwriters
Curb Records artists
Steel guitarists
Country musicians from Indiana
Guitarists from Arizona
Guitarists from Indiana
20th-century American guitarists
Country musicians from Arizona
20th-century American male musicians
Singer-songwriters from Arizona
Singer-songwriters from Indiana